Copernicia is a genus of palms native to South America and the Greater Antilles. Of the known species and nothospecies (hybrids), 22 of the 27 are endemic to Cuba. They are fan palms (Arecaceae tribe Corypheae), with the leaves with a bare petiole terminating in a rounded fan of numerous leaflets. The species are small to medium-sized trees growing to 5–30 m tall, typically occurring close to streams and rivers in savanna habitats.

Species and hybrids
Copernicia species and hybrids are as follows.

Natural hybrids

The genus is named after the  astronomer Nicolaus Copernicus.

In some of the species, the leaves are coated with a thin layer of wax, known as carnauba wax.

References

External links
 Sorting Copernicia names
 Germplasm Resources Information Network: Copernicia
 Pictures of genus members

 
Trees of the Caribbean
Trees of South America
Arecaceae genera